Harvest is the fourth studio album by Canadian-American musician Neil Young, released on February 1, 1972, by Reprise Records, catalogue number MS 2032. It featured the London Symphony Orchestra on two tracks and vocals by guests David Crosby, Graham Nash, Linda Ronstadt, Stephen Stills, and James Taylor. It topped the Billboard 200 album chart for two weeks, and spawned two hit singles, "Old Man", which peaked at No. 31 on the US Billboard Hot 100, and "Heart of Gold", which reached No. 1. It was the best-selling album of 1972 in the United States. The album has since remained Neil Young's signature album as well as his best selling.

In 2015, Harvest was inducted into the Grammy Hall of Fame.

Background
After the members of Crosby, Stills, Nash & Young went their separate ways in 1970, Young recruited a group of country session musicians (which he christened The Stray Gators) and recorded a country rock record, Harvest. The record was a massive hit, producing a US number one single in "Heart of Gold". Other songs returned to some usual Young themes: "The Needle and the Damage Done" was a lament for great artists who had been addicted to heroin, including Crazy Horse bandmate Danny Whitten; "Alabama" was "an unblushing rehash of 'Southern Man'"; to which American southern rock band Lynyrd Skynyrd wrote their 1973 hit "Sweet Home Alabama" in reply, stating "I hope Neil Young will remember, a Southern Man don't need him around, anyhow". Young later wrote of "Alabama" in his autobiography Waging Heavy Peace, saying it "richly deserved the shot Lynyrd Skynyrd gave me with their great record. I don't like my words when I listen to it. They are accusatory and condescending, not fully thought out, and too easy to misconstrue." "Words (Between the Lines of Age)", the last song on the album, featured a lengthy guitar workout with the band.

The album's success caught Young off guard and his first instinct was to back away from stardom. He would later write that the record "put me in the middle of the road. Traveling there soon became a bore so I headed for the ditch. A rougher ride but I saw more interesting people there."

According to a note posted on Young's official website on May 1, 2019, much of Harvest "was written about or for Carrie Snodgress, a wonderful actress and person and Zeke Young’s mother."

Recording

"The Needle and the Damage Done" was taken from a live solo performance at UCLA on January 30, 1971.

The recording of the remainder of Harvest was notable for the spontaneous and serendipitous way it came together. The story is told in an article in Acoustic Guitar Magazine, which includes interviews with the producer, Elliot Mazer, among others.

Young arrived in Nashville in early February 1971 to perform on a broadcast of the Johnny Cash Show where Linda Ronstadt and James Taylor would also appear. Mazer had opened Quadrafonic Sound Studios in Nashville, and invited Young to dinner (or breakfast according to another Mazer interview) on Saturday, 6 February, to convince him to record his next project at the studio. Young admired the work of the local studio musicians known as Area Code 615 who had recorded there and was interested. Young had a batch of new songs that he had been performing on the road, as seen by the repertoire on Live at Massey Hall 1971, and told Mazer that all he needed was a bass player, drummer, and pedal steel guitarist. Young made the decision to start recording that evening.

Since many of the Area Code 615 musicians were typically working on a Saturday night in Nashville, Mazer scrambled to find drummer Kenny Buttrey, bassist Tim Drummond (who was just walking down the street), and steel-guitarist Ben Keith. That night, they laid down the basic tracks for "Old Man", "Bad Fog of Loneliness", and "Dance Dance Dance". This version of "Bad Fog" was unreleased until its appearance on The Archives Vol. 1 1963–1972. "Dance Dance Dance" was also left off the album but had already appeared on the debut Crazy Horse album.

According to liner notes in Archives Volume 1, "Heart of Gold" was not recorded until Monday, 8 February. However, other sources reported that after taping the Johnny Cash Show on the evening of Sunday 7 February, Young invited Ronstadt and Taylor to come back to the studio with him. The three sat on a couch and recorded the background vocals for "Heart of Gold" and "Old Man." Taylor overdubbed a part for the latter song on Young's banjo guitar (a six-string banjo tuned like a guitar).

"A Man Needs a Maid" and "There's a World" were recorded by Jack Nitzsche with the London Symphony Orchestra in early March at Barking Assembly Hall (credited as Barking Town Hall on the album notes and now the Broadway Theatre) in the wake of Young's appearance on the BBC and concert at the Royal Festival Hall in London.

"Out on the Weekend", "Harvest" and "Journey Through the Past", along with overdubs by the session musicians James McMahon (piano on "Old Man"), John Harris (piano on "Harvest"), and Teddy Irwin (second acoustic guitar on "Heart of Gold"), were recorded in another session at Quadrafonic in April.

The electric-based songs were recorded in a barn at Young's ranch in California in September. Using a remote recording system, Mazer set up PA speakers in the barn for monitors rather than have the players wear headphones. This resulted in a lot of "leakage" as each microphone picked up sound from other instruments, but Young and Mazer liked the resulting sound. "Are You Ready for the Country", "Alabama", and "Words" were recorded in these sessions with Buttrey, Drummond, Keith, along with Nitzsche on piano and lap steel. Young named this band, which would accompany him on his tour in the winter of 1973, The Stray Gators.

Background vocals by Crosby, Stills & Nash were later recorded by Mazer in New York.

Mixing was done both at Quadrafonic and at Young's house. During playback at the ranch, Mazer ran the left channel into the PA speakers still in the barn and the right channel into speakers in the house. Young sat outside with Crosby and Nash sitting beside him listening to the mix (or Nash and Young were sitting in a rowboat on the lake—see notes). When asked about the stereo balance, he called out, "More barn."

According to a Rolling Stone interview, Young had wanted the album sleeve to biodegrade after the shrink-wrap was broken, but was overruled by the record company on the basis of expense and the possible product loss due to shipping accidents. Mo Ostin mentioned this request at the 22nd annual ASCAP pop music awards.

The 2022 documentary Harvest Time shows much of the recording process in Nashville, London, Los Angeles and New York.

Critical reception

Assessments by critics were not overwhelmingly favorable at the time. Rolling Stones John Mendelsohn called the album a disappointing retread of earlier, superior efforts by Young, writing of "the discomfortingly unmistakable resemblance of nearly every song on this album to an earlier Young composition – it's as if he just added a steel guitar and new words to After The Gold Rush." A review in The Montreal Gazette gave the album a mixed verdict, calling it "embarrassing" in places but interesting lyrically, and singling out "Are You Ready for the Country?" as the record's best cut. Reappraising the record in Christgau's Record Guide: Rock Albums of the Seventies (1981), Village Voice critic Robert Christgau wrote:

More recent evaluations of the album have been far more positive: in 1998, Q magazine readers voted Harvest the 64th greatest album of all time. In 1996, 2000 and 2005, Chart polled readers to determine the 50 greatest Canadian albums of all time – Harvest placed second in all three polls, losing the top spot to Joni Mitchell's Blue in 2000, and to Sloan's Twice Removed in the other two years. In 2003, a full three decades removed from its original harsh assessment, Rolling Stone named Harvest the 78th greatest album of all time, then was re-ranked 82nd in a 2012 revised list, and re-ranked 72nd in the 2020 list. In 2007, Harvest was named the No. 1 Canadian Album of All Time by Bob Mersereau in his book The Top 100 Canadian Albums. The album was featured in TeamRock's list of "The 10 Essential Country Rock Albums".  It was voted number 93 in Colin Larkin's All Time Top 1000 Albums 3rd Edition (2000).

According to Acclaimed Music, it is the 102nd most celebrated album in popular music history.

Reissues
On October 15, 2002, Harvest was digitally remixed and remastered for DVD-Audio format. The new 5.1 mix was the subject of minor controversy due to its unconventional panning, with the vocals in the centre of the room and the drums in the rear speakers. Harvest was remastered and released on HDCD-encoded CD and digital download on July 14, 2009, as part of the Neil Young Archives Original Release Series. A 180-gram remastered vinyl edition was released on December 1, 2009, along with remastered vinyl editions of Young's first four albums. The remastered CD exists both as a standalone album and as Disc 4 of a 4-CD box set Official Release Series Discs 1-4, released in the US in 2009 and Europe in 2012.

Track listing
All tracks are written by Neil Young. Track timings are from the original 1972 vinyl release, catalogue number MS 2032.

Neil Young Archives website outtakes
 "Bad Fog of Loneliness" – 1:57 (unreleased song, also appears on Disc 8 of the Archives Vol. 1 box set)
 "Dance Dance Dance" – 2:37 (previously unreleased version)

Personnel
Musicians
 Neil Young – lead vocals, lead and acoustic guitar, piano, harmonica
 Teddy Irwin – second acoustic guitar 
 John Harris – piano 
 James McMahon – piano 
 James Taylor – banjo, backing vocals 
 Linda Ronstadt – backing vocals 
 David Crosby – backing vocals 
 Stephen Stills – backing vocals 
 Graham Nash – backing vocals 
 London Symphony Orchestra – orchestra 
 David Meecham - conductor 

The Stray Gators
 Ben Keith – pedal steel guitar
 Jack Nitzsche – piano, lap steel guitar ; arrangements and orchestration 
 Tim Drummond – bass guitar
 Kenny Buttrey – drums

Production
 Neil Young, Elliot Mazer – producer
 Henry Lewy – producer
 Jack Nitzsche – producer

Charts

Weekly charts

Year-end charts

Certifications and sales

See also
 Neil Young discography
 List of best-selling albums in France
 List of best-selling albums in Italy
 List of number-one albums of 1972 (Australia)
 List of number-one albums of 1972 (U.S.)
 List of UK Albums Chart number ones of the 1970s

References

External links
 Neil Young Album/CD reviews

 Harvest at Myspace (streamed copy where licensed)

Neil Young albums
1972 albums
Albums produced by Jack Nitzsche
Reprise Records albums
Albums produced by Neil Young
Albums produced by Elliot Mazer
Albums produced by Henry Lewy
Albums recorded in a home studio